Anushka Naiknaware, pronounced [əˈnʊʂkaː naːi:kanəʋərɛː] (born 2003 in Portland, Oregon) is an Indian-American inventor, scientist and speaker. She is known for being the youngest person to win the Google Science Fair Award in 2016.  Born in Portland, Naiknaware created a Chitosan and Carbon Nanoparticle Based Biocompatible Sensor for Wound Management smart bandage that alerts doctors when it needs to be changed.

In 2020 she was part of Research Science Institute (RSI) conducted by Center for Excellence in Education (CEE) which brings together top STEM talent from around the world. Since 2021 she is attending Massachusetts Institute of Technology as an undergraduate student.

She was awarded the Lego Education Builder Award. She also won the first place in Mathematics STEM Award at the 2016 Broadcom MASTERS competition. In 2017, she was honored 21 Under 21 at Teen Vogue Summit by Teen Vogue Magazine published by Condé Nast. A minor planet, 33118 Naiknaware, discovered  by MIT LINEAR Lincoln laboratory is named after her.

In 2021 she was a State of Oregon Legislative Intern where she worked for representative Susan McLain. There she provided critical COVID-19 scientific analytics for decision making.

In 2017 she was invited to speak at TED Conference. As a TED  Speaker
, the talk was published in 2018. She is a speaker and advocates passion for innovation and STEM, especially for girls.

References 

Scientists from Portland, Oregon
Living people
2003 births